Santo Niño, officially the Municipality of Santo Niño, formerly known as Faire, is a 2nd class municipality in the province of Cagayan, Philippines. According to the 2020 census, it has a population of 28,537 people.

Geography

Barangays
Santo Niño is politically subdivided into 31 barangays. These barangays are headed by elected officials: Barangay Captain and Barangay Council, whose members are called Barangay Councilors. All are elected every three years.

Climate

Demographics

Economy

Government
Santo Niño, belonging to the second legislative district of the province of Cagayan, is governed by a mayor designated as its local chief executive and by a municipal council as its legislative body in accordance with the Local Government Code. The mayor, vice mayor, and the councilors are elected directly by the people through an election which is being held every three years.

Elected officials

Education
The Schools Division of Cagayan governs the town's public education system. The division office is a field office of the DepEd in Cagayan Valley region. The office governs the public and private elementary and public and private high schools throughout the municipality.

See also
List of renamed cities and municipalities in the Philippines

References

External links
[ Philippine Standard Geographic Code]
Philippine Census Information

Municipalities of Cagayan
Populated places on the Rio Grande de Cagayan
Populated places on the Rio Chico de Cagayan